The Boys in the Back Room may refer to:

The Boys in the Back Room,  1937 novel by Jules Romains
"The Boys in the Back Room",  1939 song by Frank Loesser and Frederick Hollander
The Boys in the Back Room,  1941 collection of essays by Edmund Wilson